"Infant Holy, Infant lowly" (known in Polish as W Żłobie Leży, or "In the Manger He Lies") is a traditional Polish Christmas carol. In 1920, the song was translated into English by Edith Margaret Gellibrand Reed (1885-1933), a British musician and playwright. Reed found the carol in the hymnal Spiewniczek Piesni Koscieline (published 1908), though the song itself may date back as far as the thirteenth century. The Polish text could possibly be attributed to Piotr Skarga (1536-1612).

The song's rhythm resembles that of the mazurka, a Polish folk dance popularized by Frédéric Chopin. The short, rhymed phrases lead to a crescendo in each stanza's final lines: "Christ the babe is lord of all, Christ the babe was born for you!"

Polish lyrics
W żłobie leży! Któż pobieży 
Kolędować małemu
Jezusowi Chrystusowi
Dziś nam narodzonemu?
Pastuszkowie przybywajcie
Jemu wdzięcznie przygrywajcie
Jako Panu naszemu.

My zaś sami z piosneczkami
Za wami pospieszymy
A tak Tego Maleńkiego
Niech wszyscy zobaczymy
Jak ubogo narodzony
Płacze w stajni położony
Więc go dziś ucieszymy.

English lyrics
English lyrics by Edith Margaret Gellibrand Reed (As appears in Carols for Choirs, Book 1 and 100 Carols for Choirs)

Infant holy, 
Infant lowly, 
For His bed a cattle stall; 
Oxen lowing, 
Little knowing 
Christ the Babe is Lord of all. 
Swift are winging 
Angels singing, 
Noels ringing, 
Tidings bringing, 
Christ the Babe is Lord of all.

Flocks were sleeping, 
Shepherds keeping  
Vigil till the morning new,; 
Saw the glory, 
Heard the story, 
Tidings of a Gospel true. 
Thus rejoicing, 
Free from sorrow, 
Praises voicing,  
Greet the morrow, 
Christ the Babe was born for you!

Notable recordings
The carol has been recorded by: 
 The Choir of St. Thomas NYC
 The Mormon Tabernacle Choir on their album Sing, Choirs of Angels! (2004)
 Choir of King's College, Cambridge
 Vocal Point on the album The Sing-Off: Songs of the Season (2011)
 Cara Dillon on the album Upon a Winter's Night (2016)
 Salisbury Cathedral Choir on their album Christmas at Salisbury (2010)
 Vancouver Chamber Choir on the album Classical Christmas (1997) 
 Lorie Line on the album Home for the Holidays (1997)
 Kathleen Battle and Christopher Parkening on the album Angel's Glory (1996)

See also
 List of Christmas carols

References

Christmas carols
Polish Christian hymns
Polish songs